Ruggles Island is a small island, off East Falkland in the Falkland Islands. To its east is Ruggles Bay, which forms the coast of Lafonia on East Falkland. It is just north of Speedwell Island.

The island has a couple of wrecks off it.
 In September 1860, the US clipper Sea Ranger went under here.
 In September 1885, the Italian ship Luigrya went down here, with a hold full of marble statues, which it is said in local folklore can still be seen under the water.

In 1994 a small team of divers from Port Stanley- Dave Eynon, Mike Triggs, Simon Goss and Phil Rozee discovered the Luigrya lying in about 8 metres of water of the coast of Ruggles Island, its cargo of marble is still intact.

References
 Ewen Southby-Tailyour, Falkland Island Shores.

Islands of the Falkland Islands